Tobolsk Remezov Airport  is a civil airport located about 10 km south of the city of Tobolsk. The airport received its first passenger flight on 24 September 2021.

Airlines and destinations

References

External links

Airports built in the Soviet Union